Cameron Norrie defeated Alex Molčan in the final, 6–3, 6–7(3–7), 6–1 to win the singles tennis title at the 2022 ATP Lyon Open. Norrie became the first Briton to win a clay court title on the ATP Tour since 2016.

Stefanos Tsitsipas was the defending champion, but chose not to participate.

Seeds
The top four seeds receive a bye into the second round.

Draw

Finals

Top half

Bottom half

Qualifying

Seeds

Qualifiers

Lucky losers

Qualifying draw

First qualifier

Second qualifier

Third qualifier

Fourth qualifier

References

External links
 Main draw
 Qualifying draw

ATP Lyon Open - Singles
Lyon Open
2022 in French tennis